Alexander Kendrick (July 6, 1910 in Philadelphia – May 17, 1991) was a broadcast journalist. He worked for CBS during World War II and was part of a second generation of reporters known as Murrow's Boys.

Before partnering with Edward R. Murrow, Kendrick had worked at newspapers in Chicago and Philadelphia.

Kendrick covered World War II in Europe once he had joined Murrow and CBS. During the war he traveled on Murmansk Run and covered the Eastern Front. After the war ended, Kendrick became the London Bureau Chief for CBS.

He is often remembered for helping to bring Dan Rather into journalism. 

Kendrick was also credited by Walter Cronkite as being Ed Sullivan's source of discovering the Beatles.

Books 
Prime Time: The Life of Edward R. Murrow (1969)
The Wound Within; America in the Vietnam Years, 1945-1974 (1974)

References

 Overseas Press Club: Alexander Kendrick Memorial Scholarship
 Caskets on Parade

1910 births
1991 deaths
Television personalities from Philadelphia
American male journalists
American reporters and correspondents
CBS News people
20th-century American writers
Journalists from Pennsylvania
20th-century American journalists
20th-century American male writers
Central High School (Philadelphia) alumni